Moomaw was an unincorporated community in Roanoke County, Virginia, United States.

References

Unincorporated communities in Roanoke County, Virginia
Unincorporated communities in Virginia